The 1934 Little All-America college football team is composed of college football players from small colleges and universities who were selected by the Associated Press as the best players at each position. Quarterback John Mackorell of Davidson was named captain of the 1934 Little All-America team.

First team

QB - John Mackorell, Davidson
HB - Ike Petersen, Gonzaga
HB - Fritz Hanson, North Dakota State
FB - John Turley, Ohio Wesleyan
E - William Grinnell, Tufts
E - Tod Goodwin, West Virginia
T - Tony Blazine, Illinois Wesleyan
T - Charles "Tubby" Garland, Catawba
G - Chris Kjeldsen, Pacific
G - Loren Grannis, Willamette
C - Rudy Prochaska, Tulsa

Second team

QB - Ralph Semerad, Union
HB - Floyd "Cocky" Sexton, Fort Hays Teachers
HB - John Arrambide, Whittier
FB - Walter Froelich, Tufts
E - Hermit Davis, Birmingham Southern
E - Spud Taylor, Davis & Elkins
T - Luke Kellam, Trinity (CT)
T - Joe Stydahar, West Virginia
G - Tom Brown, Western State
G - Bill Mackey, Emory & Henry
C - Jim Martell, Bluefield

See also
 1934 College Football All-America Team

References

Little All-America college football team
Little All-America college football teams